George Meitamei Manangoi (born 29 November 2000) is a Kenyan middle-distance runner.

In the 1,500 metres event, his personal best is a 3:31.49 (Stade Louis II, Monaco, 12 July 2019). He won this event at the 2018 U20 World Championships in Tampere, defeating Jakob Ingebrigtsen.
He is the young brother of Elijah Manangoi, who is also a middle-distance runner.

On 20 July 2018, he attempted and failed to break the junior world record in the 1,000 metres during the Herculis track meet in Monaco, and was defeated by Solomon Lekuta.

He also won the 1500 metres event at the 2019 African Games in Rabat.

Personal bests
Outdoor

From World Athletics Profile

References

External links
IAAF Athlete’s profile

2000 births
Living people
Athletes (track and field) at the 2019 African Games
African Games gold medalists for Kenya
African Games medalists in athletics (track and field)
World Athletics U20 Championships winners
African Games gold medalists in athletics (track and field)
Kenyan male middle-distance runners
World Youth Championships in Athletics winners
21st-century Kenyan people